Eliza Greene Metcalf Radeke (1854–1931) was the president of the Rhode Island School of Design (RISD) in Providence, Rhode Island from 1913 to 1931 and was the daughter of RISD co-founder Helen Adelia Rowe Metcalf.

Biography 
Eliza Greene Metcalf Radeke was born in Augusta, Georgia on December 11, 1854 while her father, Jesse Metcalf was working as a cotton buyer. Eliza Radeke's mother Helen Adelia Rowe Metcalf was the co-founder of RISD in 1877.  Radeke's brother, Jesse H. Metcalf, was a U.S. Senator from Rhode Island. Eliza Metcalf attended Dr. Stockbridge's School in Providence and then received her A.B. from Vassar College in 1876. She later received an honorary A.M. from Brown University in 1914. 

Eliza Metcalf married Dr. Gustav Radeke, M.D., of Providence on May 27, 1880. In 1913 several years after her mother's death, Eliza Radeke became President of the Rhode Island School of Design (RISD) and served on the Women's Advisory Committee of the Women's College at Brown University. She also served as a director of the American Federation of Arts. She was a member of the Unitarian Church and pursued various outdoor activities.

Radeke was noted also for her collection of Pennsylvania German pottery, begun in 1911; she was one of the first major collectors to focus on the field of American folk art.

See also 
 List of presidents of the Rhode Island School of Design

References

1854 births
1931 deaths
Presidents of the Rhode Island School of Design
People from Providence, Rhode Island
American Unitarians
Rhode Island School of Design faculty
Vassar College alumni
Brown University alumni
Pembroke College in Brown University alumni